Ballia Railway station is a railway station in Ballia, Uttar Pradesh with station code BUI. It serves Ballia city. The station consists of four platforms and new 26 coach Modern LHB Washing Pit is waiting for inauguration.  The station catering to about 80 trains including two Rajdhani Expresses. The station is well developed and include facilities like a waiting room, two bridges, a ticket counter, enquiry, three entrance gates, four platforms, food counters, a bookstall, vehicle parking, etc. Escalator and lifts are in construction and will be completed soon.

The station comes under A category railway station.

Ballia is a very important and busy railway station and in future with the completions of mau-Gazipur-Dildarngar line Ballia will be directly connected to Howrah-Amritsar mainline and will become more important and busy and will serve to more than 115 train. 

A new line has been passed by railway between Ballia  and Aara and  With implementation of this line thousands of people will get benefits and will get good connectivity with Aara , Patna and other cities of Bihar and will also be connected to Howrah-Amritsar Mainline.

Bhrigu Superfast, Ballia Sealdah & Ballia Humsafar Express are few Express Trains which runs from Ballia.

The code for the station is BUI. The station serves as the connection point to various places like Varanasi, Ahmedabad, Mumbai, Delhi, Chennai, Kolkata, Bhopal, Udhna, Lucknow, Jaipur, Patna, Kanpur, Aligarh, Amritsar, Dibrugarh, Guwahati, Ajmer, Gorakhpur, Chhapra, and Mau etc. It is on the border of Bihar and Uttar Pradesh.

Trains running through Ballia

The station on a daily basis caters to 80 trains including 2 Rajdhani Express that pass by.

Few major trains that connect through Ballia for locations that are of religious or tourist speciality include: Bhrigu Superfast Express, Sealdah–Ballia Express, Sarnath Express, Sabarmati Express, Sadhbhawna Express, Ganga Kaveri Express, Garib Nawaz Express, Delhi Ballia Clone Special Express.

The connectivity of the trains joins Ballia from the rest of India be it in the west, north, south, or east. The notable attraction of the town is Dadri Mela which is the second largest cattle fair of India. The fair also attracts a lot of people from across cities to come and witness this fair.

Services

Some of the important trains that originate/terminate

22427/22428 Bhrigu Superfast Express
04055/04056 Ballia Delhi Clone Special Express
Sealdah–Ballia Express
Ballia–Varanasi City Passenger
Ballia–Varanasi City DEMU
Ballia– Shahganj Passenger

References

Railway stations in Ballia district
Varanasi railway division
Ballia